63rd parallel may refer to:

63rd parallel north, a circle of latitude in the Northern Hemisphere
63rd parallel south, a circle of latitude in the Southern Hemisphere